Intro is the debut album of pop singer Danny Fernandes. It was co-written and co-produced by rapper Belly. The album features the hit singles "Curious" (featuring Juelz Santana), "Private Dancer (featuring Belly)," "Fantasy", "Never Again", and "Addicted". It was released on October 14, 2008 in Canada.

Track listing

CP Records
CP Records has recently secured a US release for Fernandes through a newly signed deal with Miami-based VIP Music.

Tour
On October 15, Fernandes launched into his first coast-to-coast Canadian tour with The Pussycat Dolls' protégés Girlicious. He is currently the opening act for them. From an early age "Danny didn't just think he could dance… he knew it!" Practicing in front of mirrors, perfecting his craft from his bedroom to the dance studio, then meeting his good friend and dance mentor "So You Think You Can Dance Canada" judge Luther Brown, who has reunited with Danny to choreograph his performance for Danny's national tour with [Girlicious] (which he ended up dating Nichole Cordova in late 2008 until early 2009) and embark on his Fantasy Tour.

Chart positions

References

2008 debut albums
Danny Fernandes albums
CP Music Group albums